The Albera Massif is a mountain range located in the south of Pyrénées-Orientales and the north of Catalonia, between France and Spain. It is the main easternmost prolongation of the Pyrenees. Its highest peak is the Puig Neulós, with an elevation of 1,256 metres.

Most of the southern side of the range is part of the Paratge Natural d'Interès Nacional de l'Albera natural reserve. There are some ancient megaliths in the range. The Col du Perthus marks the western boundary of the massif.

History
The Albera Range became the border between France and Spain following the Treaty of the Pyrenees, when Philip IV of Spain ceded a part of the Spanish kingdom to Louis XIV of France, dividing Northern Catalonia from Historical Catalonia.

Gallery

See also
Treaty of the Pyrenees
Mountains of Catalonia
 Coll de Banyuls

References

External links 

Paratge Natural d'Interès Nacional de l'Albera
Requesens - Puig Neulós hiking route
Manel Figuera i Abadal, 50 ascensions fàcils pel Pirineu català, Valls, Cossetània, 2008
Centre de reproducció de tortugues de l'Albera

Mountain ranges of Catalonia
Pyrenees
Northeastern Spain and Southern France Mediterranean forests